Robert I, also Robert of Courtenay (died 1228), Latin Emperor of Constantinople, was a younger son of the emperor Peter II of Courtenay, and Yolanda of Flanders.

When it became known in France that Peter of Courtenay was dead, his eldest son, Philip, Marquis of Namur, renounced the succession to the Latin empire of Constantinople in favor of his brother Robert, who set out to take possession of his distracted inheritance. On the way to his new homeland, Robert stayed in Hungary from autumn 1220 to early 1221, enjoying the hospitality of his brother-in-law Andrew II of Hungary. It is possible that Villard de Honnecourt also belonged to his entourage. Robert and Andrew made political alliance against Theodore Komnenos Doukas, Despot of Epirus. Andrew II and his heir Béla escorted Robert until the Bulgarian border. There Robert mediated the wedding between Tsar Ivan Asen II and Andrew's daughter, Anna Maria.

Crowned emperor on 25 March 1221, Robert's first loss was Thessalonica in 1224 to Theodore Doukas of Epirus. Worried about the situation of the Catholic Latin Empire, pope Honorius III called for a crusade for the defense of Thessalonica, but the response was ineffective. In the same year, Robert's empire would suffer another defeat to John Ducas Vatatzes at the Battle of Poimanenos.

Following this defeat Robert was compelled to make peace with his chief foe, John III Ducas Vatatzes, emperor of Nicaea, who was confirmed in all his conquests. Robert promised to marry Eudokia, daughter of the late emperor of Nicaea, Theodore I Lascaris and Anna Angelina. He had been betrothed to Eudokia on a former occasion; the circumstances surrounding the failed negotiations are unclear, but George Akropolites states that the arrangement was blocked on religious grounds by the Orthodox Patriarch Manuel Sarantenos: Robert's sister Marie de Courtenay was married to Emperor Theodore I Laskaris. Accordingly, Robert, already Theodore's brother-in-law, could not also be his son-in-law.  Regardless, Robert soon repudiated this engagement, and married the Lady of Neuville, already the fiancée of a Burgundian gentleman. Heading a conspiracy, the Burgundian drove Robert from Constantinople, he fled to Rome to seek redress from the pope who convinced him to return to Constantinople, but on his return trip, in early in 1228, the emperor died in Morea.

Notes

References

 
 
 
 
 

Year of birth missing
1228 deaths
13th-century Latin Emperors of Constantinople
Christians of the Crusades
Capetian House of Courtenay